Andrea Gamarnik (born 1964) is an Argentinian molecular virologist noted for her work on Dengue fever. She received a 2016 L'Oréal-UNESCO Awards for Women in Science fellowship for work on mosquito-borne viruses include Dengue fever. She studied at the University of Buenos Aires and the University of California, San Francisco. She has done work for the Leloir Institute. She is the first female Argentinian to become a member of the American Academy of Microbiology.

References

External links

Argentine virologists
1964 births
Living people
Argentine women scientists
Women virologists
L'Oréal-UNESCO Awards for Women in Science laureates
21st-century women scientists
University of Buenos Aires alumni
University of California, San Francisco alumni
21st-century Argentine scientists